The zygomatico-orbital foramina are two canals in the skull, that allow nerves to pass through. The orifices are seen on the orbital process of the zygomatic bone.

One of these canals opens into the temporal fossa, the other on the malar surface of the bone.

The former transmits the zygomaticotemporal, the latter the zygomaticofacial nerve.

References

External links

Foramina of the skull